The claim that Eskimo words for snow (specifically Yupik and Inuit words) are unusually numerous, particularly in contrast to English, is often used to support the controversial linguistic-relativity hypothesis or "Whorfianism". The strongest interpretation of this hypothesis, which posits that a language's vocabulary (among other features) shapes or defines its speakers' view of the world, has been largely discredited, though a 2010 study supports the core notion that these languages have many more words for "snow" than the English language. The original claim is based in the work of anthropologist Franz Boas and was particularly promoted by his contemporary, Benjamin Lee Whorf, whose name is connected with the hypothesis.

Overview
Franz Boas did not make quantitative claims but rather pointed out that the Eskimo–Aleut languages have about the same number of distinct word roots referring to snow as English does, but the structure of these languages tends to allow more variety as to how those roots can be modified in forming a single word.  A good deal of the ongoing debate thus depends on how one defines "word", and perhaps even "word root".

The first re-evaluation of the claim was by linguist Laura Martin in 1986, who traced the history of the claim and argued that its prevalence had diverted attention from serious research into linguistic relativity. A subsequent influential and humorous, and polemical, essay by Geoff Pullum repeated Martin's critique, calling the process by which the so-called "myth" was created the "Great Eskimo Vocabulary Hoax". Pullum argued that the fact that the number of word roots for snow is about equally large in Eskimoan languages and English indicates that there exists no difference in the size of their respective vocabularies to define snow.  Other specialists in the matter of Eskimoan languages and Eskimoan knowledge of snow and especially sea ice argue against this notion and defend Boas's original fieldwork amongst the Inuit of Baffin Island.

Languages in the Inuit and Yupik language groups add suffixes to words to express the same concepts expressed in English and many other languages by means of compound words, phrases, and even entire sentences. One can create a practically unlimited number of new words in the Eskimoan languages on any topic, not just snow, and these same concepts can be expressed in other languages using combinations of words. In general and especially in this case, it is not necessarily meaningful to compare the number of words between languages that create words in different ways due to different grammatical structures.

On the other hand, some anthropologists have argued that Boas, who lived among Baffin islanders and learnt their language, did in fact take account of the polysynthetic nature of Inuit language and included "only words representing meaningful distinctions" in his account. Igor Krupnik, an anthropologist at the Smithsonian Arctic Studies Center in Washington, supports Boas's work but notes that Boas was careful to include only words representing meaningful distinctions. Krupnik and others charted the vocabulary of about 10 Inuit and Yupik dialects and concluded that they indeed have many more words for snow than English does. Central Siberian Yupik has 40 terms. Inuit dialect spoken in Canada’s Nunavik region has at least 53, including “matsaaruti,” for wet snow that can be used to ice a sleigh’s runners, and “pukak,” for crystalline powder snow that looks like salt. Within these dialects, the vocabulary associated with sea ice is even richer. In the Inupiaq dialect of Wales, Alaska, Krupnik documented 70 terms for ice including: “utuqaq,” ice that lasts year after year; “siguliaksraq,” a patchwork layer of crystals that form as the sea begins to freeze; and “auniq,” ice that is filled with holes. Similarly, the Sami people, who live in the northern tips of Scandinavia and Russia, use at least 180 words related to snow and ice, according to Ole Henrik Magga, a linguist in Norway. (Unlike Inuit dialects, Sami ones are not polysynthetic, making it easier to distinguish words.)

Studies of the Sami languages of Norway, Sweden and Finland, conclude that the languages have anywhere from 180 snow- and ice-related words and as many as 300 different words for types of snow, tracks in snow, and conditions of the use of snow.

Origins and significance 
The first reference to Inuit having multiple words for snow is in the introduction to Handbook of American Indian languages (1911) by linguist and anthropologist Franz Boas. He says:

The essential morphological question is why a language would say, for example, "lake", "river", and "brook" instead of something like "waterplace", "waterfast", and "waterslow". English has many snow-related words, but Boas's intent may have been to connect differences in culture with differences in language.

Edward Sapir's and Benjamin Whorf's hypothesis of linguistic relativity holds that the language we speak both affects and reflects our view of the world. This idea is also reflected in the concept behind general semantics. In a popular 1940 article on the subject, Whorf referred to Eskimo languages having several words for snow: 

Later writers, prominently Roger Brown in his "Words and things" and Carol Eastman in her "Aspects of Language and Culture", inflated the figure in sensationalized stories: by 1978, the number quoted had reached fifty, and on February 9, 1984, an unsigned editorial in The New York Times gave the number as one hundred. However, the linguist G. Pullum shows that Inuit and other related dialects do not possess an extraordinarily large number of terms for snow.

Inuit word roots 
Three distinct word roots with the meaning "snow" are reconstructed for the Proto-Eskimo language: *qaniɣ 'falling snow', *aniɣu 'fallen snow', and *apun 'snow on the ground'. These three stems are found in all Inuit languages and dialects—except for West Greenlandic, which lacks *aniɣu.  The Alaskan and Siberian Yupik people (among others) however, are not Inuit, nor are their languages Inuit or Inupiaq, but all are classifiable as Eskimos, lending further ambiguity to the "Eskimo Words for Snow" debate.

See also 
 ; also discusses words for snow in other languages

Notes

References

Further reading 
 Martin, Laura (1986). "Eskimo Words for Snow: A case study in the genesis and decay of an anthropological example". American Anthropologist 88 (2), 418–23.  
 Pullum, Geoffrey K. (1991). The Great Eskimo Vocabulary Hoax and other Irreverent Essays on the Study of Language. University of Chicago Press. 
 
 Kaplan, Larry (2003). Inuit Snow Terms: How Many and What Does It Mean?. In: Building Capacity in Arctic Societies: Dynamics and shifting perspectives. Proceedings from the 2nd IPSSAS Seminar. Iqaluit, Nunavut, Canada: May 26-June 6, 2003, ed. by François Trudel. Montreal: CIÉRA—Faculté des sciences sociales Université Laval. 
 Cichocki, Piotr and Marcin Kilarski (2010). "On 'Eskimo Words for Snow': The life cycle of a linguistic misconception". Historiographia Linguistica 37 (3), 341–377.  
 
 

 Robson, David (2012). Are there really 50 Eskimo words for snow?, New Scientist no. 2896, 72–73. 
 Weyapuk, Winton Jr, et al. (2012). Kiŋikmi Sigum Qanuq Ilitaavut [Wales Inupiaq Sea Ice Dictionary]. Washington DC: Arctic Studies Center Smithsonian.

External links 
 Geoffrey K. Pullum's explanation from Language Log
 "Eskimo" words for snow by Steven DeRose, including English lists
 Snow' lexemes in Yup'ik (reposted)
 100+ Inuit Words for Sea Ice by Igor Krupnik.

Eskaleut languages
Snow in culture
Snowclones
Urban legends
Stereotypes of Inuit people
Misconceptions